Patrick David Slogic (born September 13, 1991 in Okinawa, Japan) is an American soccer player who currently plays for the Charlotte Independence in the United Soccer League.

Career

College and amateur
Slogic played fours years of college soccer at Cornell University between 2010 and 2013, while earning his degree in Environmental Engineering from Cornell's College of Engineering in 7 semesters.

While at college, Slogic also appeared for USL PDL club Reading United AC in 2013.

Professional
Slogic was drafted by the Columbus Crew of the MLS in 2014 after playing in the 2014 MLS Player Combine.

Slogic signed his first professional deal with USL Pro club Rochester Rhinos on April 4, 2014 after playing with the Columbus Crew.

Slogic joined the expansion Charlotte Independence for the 2015 season.

References

1991 births
Living people
American soccer players
Cornell Big Red men's soccer players
Reading United A.C. players
Rochester New York FC players
Charlotte Independence players
Soccer players from Colorado
USL League Two players
USL Championship players
Association football defenders